Zou Jing, may refer to:

 Zou Jing (Eastern Han), Chinese military officer in the Eastern Han.

 Zou Jing (engineer), Chinese engineer, member of the Chinese Academy of Engineering.